Geldeston is a village and civil parish in the English county of Norfolk.

History
Geldeston's name is of Anglo-Saxon origin and derives from the Old English for Gyldi's farmstead or settlement.

Geldeston is not listed in the Domesday Book.

Geldeston is home to a crinkle crankle wall (located close to the village green), which are found most commonly in Suffolk.

Geography
According to the 2011 Census, Geldeston has a population of 397 residents living in 179 households.

Geldeston falls within the constituency of South Norfolk and is represented at Parliament by Richard Bacon MP of the Conservative Party. For the purposes of local government, the parish falls within the district of South Norfolk.

St. Michael's Church
Geldeston's parish church is dedicated to Saint Michael and is one of Norfolk's 124 remaining round-tower churches. The church was significantly remodelled in the mid-Nineteenth Century based on the designs of Thomas Penrice and J. L. Clemence, with stained-glass depicting the Risen Christ installed by Leonard Walker in the mid-Twentieth Century. St Michael is a Church of England church, falling under the Diocese of Norwich. The current incumbent of the parish is the Reverend David Smith, who was licensed as priest-in-charge of the Waveney Benefice and the Raveningham Group on 4 March 2020. He moved from the Harling United Benefice in southwest Norfolk. The previous rector, until June 2018, was Julie Oddy-Bates.

Amenities
The village hall was originally opened in 1924. It underwent significant renovation from 2016 onwards and is now a registered charity.

Notable people
 Dorothy Hodgkin (1910-1994) – Nobel Prize in Chemistry winner

References

External links

Geldeston Village Hall website
Geldeston Village, Norfolk village website
St Michael's on the European Round Tower Churches Website
Tidings: Parish News for Ellingham, Gillingham, Geldeston, Kirby Cane and Stockton print and online editions.

Villages in Norfolk
Civil parishes in Norfolk